Arif Khan (born 9 March 1990) is an Indian alpine skier, who competes in the slalom. In 2011, he won two gold medals: in the slalom and giant slalom Alpine Skiing at the South Asian Winter Games.

He represented India at the 2022 Winter Olympics in the slalom and giant slalom events. He finished in the 45th position in the giant slalom event and will play the slalom event on the 16th.

Arif had previously competed at the 2017 Asian Winter Games held in Sapporo.

2022 Winter Olympics
The 31-year-old Arif was the lone Indian competitor at the Games, having qualified in Slalom and Giant Slalom events. India sent a six-member contingent to the Games including a coach, a technician, and a team manager.

Arif is the first Indian to secure qualification in two events of the same edition of the Games.

He had little hope of winning a medal, but Khan’s expectation in Beijing was to ski down nicely and make it to the finish line. Khan now has his eyes set on the 2026 Olympics.

Khan was conferred with Jammu and Kashmir government award by The Government of Jammu and Kashmir in the sports category.

Alpine skiing results
All results are sourced from the International Ski Federation (FIS).

Olympic results

World Championship results

See also
Alpine skiing at the 2022 Winter Olympics – Men's giant slalom
2022 Winter Olympics Parade of Nations

References

External links
 

1990 births
Living people
People from Baramulla district
Skiers from Jammu and Kashmir
Indian male alpine skiers
Olympic alpine skiers of India
Alpine skiers at the 2022 Winter Olympics
Alpine skiers at the 2017 Asian Winter Games
South Asian Winter Games gold medalists for India
South Asian Winter Games medalists in alpine skiing